The Borsos Competition is the main awards program for Canadian feature films screening at the annual Whistler Film Festival. Introduced for the first time in 2004, the juried competition presents six awards annually to honour films, actors, screenplays, directors, cinematographers and editors in Canadian cinema.

The award is named in memory of Canadian film director Phillip Borsos.

The festival also presents several other awards, which are not part of the Borsos Competition.

Best Canadian Feature Film

Best Performance in a Borsos Competition Film
From 2006 to 2010, separate awards were presented for actors and actresses. Since 2012, only one gender-neutral award for best performance is presented.

Best Director of a Borsos Competition Film

Best Screenplay of a Borsos Competition Film

Best Cinematography in a Borsos Competition Film

Best Editing in a Borsos Competition Film

References

Canadian film awards
Awards established in 2004
2004 establishments in British Columbia
Whistler Film Festival